Flowing Wells is a census-designated place (CDP) in Pima County, Arizona, United States. It is a suburb of Tucson. The population was 16,419 at the 2010 census.

The Flowing Wells community was given an All-American City Award by the National Civic League in 2007.

Geography
Flowing Wells is located at  (32.291305, -111.008859).

Flowing Wells is roughly bound by Interstate 10 to the West, the Rillito River to the North, and the City of Tucson to the South and East. 

It is entirely within Arizona's 2nd congressional district, on the western side of the district. Additionally, it is within Arizona's 9th legislative district and primarily within Pima County's 3rd supervisor district, though the northern portion of the CDP is within the 1st supervisor district.

Demographics

As of the census of 2000, there were 15,050 people, 6,250 households, and 3,849 families residing in the CDP. The racial makeup of the CDP was 84.2% White, 0.9% Black or African American, 1.5% Native American, 0.7% Asian, 0.1% Pacific Islander, 9.1% from other races, and 3.6% from two or more races.  21.9% of the population were Hispanic or Latino of any race.

There were 6,250 households, out of which 28.1% had children under the age of 18 living with them, 42.3% were married couples living together, 14.0% had a female householder with no husband present, and 38.4% were non-families. 31.6% of all households were made up of individuals, and 14.8% had someone living alone who was 65 years of age or older.  The average household size was 2.4 and the average family size was 3.0.

In the CDP, the population was spread out, with 25.4% under the age of 18, 7.9% from 18 to 24, 27.5% from 25 to 44, 20.9% from 45 to 64, and 18.2% who were 65 years of age or older.  The median age was 38 years. For every 100 females, there were 91.5 males.  For every 100 females age 18 and over, there were 87.7 males.

The median income for a household in the CDP was $26,517, and the median income for a family was $31,786. Males had a median income of $26,235 versus $21,972 for females. The per capita income for the CDP was $14,833.  About 15.2% of families and 17.1% of the population were below the poverty line, including 24.2% of those under age 18 and 9.8% of those age 65 or over.

In 2010 Flowing Wells had a population of 16,419.  The racial and ethnic composition of the population was 58.2% non-Hispanic white, 1.7% African American, 2.0% Native American, 1.2% Asian, 0.1% Pacific Islander, 0.1% non-Hispanic of some other race, 3.7% two or more races and 36.3% Hispanic or Latino.

Economy

Primary and secondary schools
Flowing Wells Unified School District operates public schools in Flowing Wells and serves much of Flowing Wells (the extreme eastern part of the census-designated place is served by Amphitheater Public Schools).

Flowing Wells USD schools: Emily Meschter Early Learning Center is located in Flowing Wells. District elementary schools in Flowing Wells include Centennial Elementary School, Homer Davis Elementary School, and Laguna Elementary School. Flowing Wells Junior High School is located in Flowing Wells.

Public libraries
Pima County Public Library operates the Flowing Wells Branch Library.

Water 
The Flowing Wells Irrigation District, an independent public water provider founded in 1922, provides water for the southern majority portion of the CDP.

See also

Flowing Wells Witch Trial

References

External links
Flowing Wells Neighborhood Association & Community Coalition
Flowing Wells Unified School District

Census-designated places in Pima County, Arizona
Populated places in the Sonoran Desert